Morya is a Marathi movie and released on 19 August 2011. Directed and produced by Avdhoot Gupte along with Atul Kamble.

Cast 

The cast includes Santosh Juvekar, Chinmay Mandlekar, Pari Telang, Spruha Joshi, Dilip Prabhawalkar, Ganesh Yadav, Pushkar Shrotri, Sunil Ranade and others.

Soundtrack
The music is produced by Avadhoot Gupte and co-directed by Amit Sonmale.

Track listing

References

External links 
 Movie Review - marathishowbiz.com
 

2011 films
2010s Marathi-language films